Lamiya Valiyeva (born 5 April 2002) is an Azerbaijani Paralympic athlete who specializes in sprints. She represented Azerbaijan at the 2020 Summer Paralympics.

Career
Valiyeva represented Azerbaijan in the women's 100 metres T13 event at the 2020 Summer Paralympics and won a silver medal.

Valiyeva represented Azerbaijan in the women's 400 metres T13 event at the 2020 Summer Paralympics and won a gold medal.

References

2002 births
Living people
Paralympic athletes of Azerbaijan
Athletes (track and field) at the 2020 Summer Paralympics
Medalists at the 2020 Summer Paralympics
Paralympic gold medalists for Azerbaijan
Paralympic silver medalists for Azerbaijan
Paralympic medalists in athletics (track and field)
Azerbaijani female sprinters
21st-century Azerbaijani women